Violi is an Italian surname. Notable people with the surname include:
Angela Violi, Italian combustion engineer
Paolo Violi (1931–1978), Italian-Canadian mobster
Violi brothers, sons of Paolo Violi of the Luppino-Violi crime family
Paolo Vietti-Violi (1882–1965), Italian architect
Paul Violi (1944–2011), American poet
Marcello Violi, Italian rugby player
Dario Violi (1906–1967), Italian politician

Italian-language surnames